Under the Stars is a 2001 film set in Cyprus.

Synopsis

Cast
 Mirto Alikaki as Foivi
 Akis Sakellariou as Loukas
 Stella Fyrogeni as Loukas' Mother
 Ahilleas Grammatikopoulos as Foivi's Father
 Marinos Hadjivassiliou as Panikos
 Antonis Katsaris as Actor
 Andros Kritikos as Uncle Nikos
 Neoklis Neokleous as Loukas' father
 Stelios Onoufriou as Lukas 
 Nefeli Papadaki as Phoebe
 Christina Paulidou as Foivi's Mother
 Sotos Stavrakis as Alexis

Release
Under the Stars was released in Greece on 15 November 2001 at the Thessaloniki International Film Festival; the Netherlands on 31 January 2001 at the International Film Festival Rotterdam; Serbia on 3 February 2002 at the Belgrade Film Festival; the United Kingdom on 3 July 2002 at the Commonwealth Film Festival; and Ireland on 17 February 2004 at the Dublin Film Festival.

Awards
Audience Award, Commonwealth Film Festival.
Montreal First Film Prize, Montreal World Film Festival.
Nominated Golden Alexander, Thessaloniki Film Festival.

References

External links
http://jam.canoe.ca/Movies/Reviews/U/Under_The_Stars/2004/04/16/754604.html
http://www.biosagenda.nl/film_under-the-stars_4104.html
http://www.brooklynfilmfestival.org/films/detail.asp?fid=238
http://www.imdb.com/title/tt0295366/

2001 films
Cypriot drama films
Greek drama films
Films set in Cyprus
2001 drama films
British drama films
2000s British films